The Romanian Carpathian Shepherd Dog  is a large breed of livestock guardian dogs that originated in the Carpathian Mountains of Romania.

History
In March 1998, a group of fans of the Carpathian Shepherd Dog founded the Carpathian Shepherd Dogs Club. The club was later renamed the National Club of Carpathian Shepherd Dog Breeders.  The club observed that there many Carpathians in Rucăr, Argeș County that are considered ancestors of today's Carpathians.

A conference on the factors involved in the Romanian breeds took place in Bistrița 
in March 2003. The provisional homologation of the Carpathian Shepherd Dog was approved on July 6, 2005 in Buenos Aires.

Health
The breed has a life expectancy of about 12–14 years.

Temperament
A very devoted, well-mannered, courageous dog, it was originally used to protect flocks of sheep or its master from any potential harm during herding (bears, wolves, thieves, etc...).

See also

 Bucovina Shepherd Dog
 List of dog breeds
 Romanian Mioritic Shepherd Dog
 Romanian Raven Shepherd Dog

References

External links

 Romanian Carpathian Shepherd Dog
 The National Club of Romanian Carpathian Shepherd Dog breeders 
 Canine Efficiency information about Carpatins and other LGDs

Dog breeds originating in Romania
FCI breeds
Livestock guardian dogs